Robert Willard Burbank (1856-1906) was an American lawyer, and the 49th Attorney General of Rhode Island, serving from 1891 to 1894.

Biography
He was born on September 14, 1856, in Koloa, Hawaii. 
He attended the Friends' Boarding School in Providence and Brown University, graduating in 1878. He was admitted to the bar in 1880, and practiced law in Providence. He was a member of Central Congregational Church.

He married Martha Anna Taylor on April 12, 1883.

References

1856 births
People from Kauai
1906 deaths
Place of death missing
Date of death missing
Brown University alumni
Moses Brown School alumni
Rhode Island lawyers
Rhode Island Attorneys General